The Minister of Commerce was a cabinet member in the Government of France. The position sometimes included responsibility for other government departments such as Public Works, Interior, Agriculture and Posts, Telegraphs and Telephones.  
The position has largely been merged today into the expanded Ministry of the Economy, Finance and Industry.

Officeholders

Ministers of Commerce and Manufacture

In 1812 Napoleon created a Ministry of Commerce and Manufacture (Ministère du Commerce et des Manufactures), which he assigned to Jean-Baptiste Collin de Sussy. That ministry was suppressed in 1814.

 16 January 1812 – 1 April 1814 : Jean-Baptiste Collin de Sussy

A royal ordinance of 22 January 1828 recreated the Ministry of Commerce and Manufacture, which covered manufacture and interior and exterior commerce, which were detached from the Ministry of the Interior. The ministry was suppressed by ordinance of 8 August 1829, and these services were again made part of the department of the interior.

 29 January 1828 – 8 August 1829 : Pierre de Saint-Cricq

Ministers of Commerce and Public works 

An ordinance of 17 March 1831 created the Ministry of Commerce and Public works (Ministère du Commerce et des Travaux publics), to which the minister had been named on 13 March 1831. This ministry included agriculture, subsistence, stud farms, interior and exterior commerce and statistics, detached from the department of the Interior.

 13 March 1831 – 31 December 1832 : Antoine, comte d'Argout
 31 December 1832 – 4 April 1834 : Adolphe Thiers

Ministers of Commerce
A royal ordinance of 6 April 1834 created the Ministry of Commerce (Ministère du Commerce), with the same functions as the Ministry of Commerce and Public works .

 4 April 1834 – 10 November 1834 : Charles Marie Tanneguy Duchâtel
 10 November 1834 – 18 November 1834 : Jean-Baptiste Teste
 18 November 1834 – 22 February 1836 : Charles Marie Tanneguy Duchâtel

Ministers of Commerce and Public works 
An ordinance of 2 March 1836 recreated the Ministry of Commerce and Public works, with the added responsibilities of bridges, roads and mines.

 22 February 1836 – 6 September 1836 : Hippolyte Passy
 6–19 September 1836 : Comte Duchatel (interim)

Ministers of Public Works, Agriculture and Commerce
An ordinance of 19 September 1836 changed the name without changing the function, to the Ministère des travaux publics, d'agriculture et du commerce'''.

 19 September 1836 – 31 March 1839 : Nicolas Martin du Nord
 31 March 1839 – 12 May 1839 : Adrien de Gasparin

Ministers of Agriculture and Commerce
A royal ordinance of 23 May 1839 reconstituted the ministry as Agriculture and Commerce, with the same duties as that of the ordinance of 6 April 1834.
 12 May 1839 – 1 March 1840 : Laurent Cunin-Gridaine
 1 March 1840 – 29 October 1840 : Alexandre Goüin
 29 October 1840 – 24 February 1848 : Laurent Cunin-Gridaine
 24 February 1848 – 11 May 1848 : Eugène Bethmont
 11 May 1848 – 28 June 1848 : Ferdinand Flocon
 28 June 1848 – 20 December 1848 : Charles Gilbert Tourret
 20 December 1848 – 29 December 1848 : Jacques Alexandre Bixio
 9 December 1848 – 2 June 1849 : Louis Joseph Buffet
 2 June 1849 – 31 October 1849 : Victor Ambroise LanJuneais
 31 October 1849 – 9 January 1851 : Jean-Baptiste Dumas
 9 January 1851 – 24 January 1851 : Louis Bernard Bonjean
 24 January 1851 – 10 April 1851 : Eugène Schneider
 10 April 1851 – 26 October 1851 : Louis Joseph Buffet
 26 October 1851 – 26 November 1851 : François, comte de Casabianca
 26 November 1851 – 25 January 1852 : Noël-Jacques Lefebvre-Duruflé

Ministers of the Interior, Agriculture and Commerce
A decree of 25 January 1852 reunited the Ministry of Agriculture and Commerce with that of the Interior, under the title Ministère de l'intérieur, de l'agriculture et du commerce''.
 25 January 1852 – 14 February 1853 : Victor Fialin, comte de Persigny

Ministers of Agriculture, Commerce and Public Works

A decree of 23 June 1853 reinstated the Ministry of Agriculture, Commerce and Public Works.
 23 June 1853 – 3 February 1855 : Pierre Magne
 3 February 1855 – 23 June 1863 : Eugène Rouher
 23 June 1863 – 20 January 1867 : Armand Béhic
 20 January 1867 – 17 December 1868 : Adolphe Forcade La Roquette
 17 December 1868 – 17 July 1869 : Edmond Valléry Gressier

Ministers of Agriculture and Commerce
A decree of 17 July 1869 reestablished the Ministry of Agriculture and Commerce as it had been before the decree of 25 January 1852.

 17 July 1869 – 2 January 1870 : Alfred Leroux
 2 January 1870 – 10 August 1870 : Charles Louvet de Couvray
 10 August 1870 – 4 September 1870 : Clément Aimé Jean Duvernois
 4 September 1870 – 19 February 1871 : Pierre Magnin
 19 February 1871 – 5 June 1871 : Félix Lambrecht
 5 June 1871 – 6 February 1872 : Victor Lefranc
 6 February 1872 – 23 April 1872 : Eugène de Goulard
 23 April 1872 – 25 May 1873 : Pierre Teisserenc de Bort
 25 May 1873 – 26 November 1873 : Joseph de la Bouillerie
 29 November 1873 – 22 May 1874 : Alfred Deseilligny
 22 May 1874 – 10 March 1875 : Louis Grivart
 10 March 1875 – 9 March 1876 : Marie Camille Alfred, vicomte de Meaux
 9 March 1876 – 17 May 1877 : Pierre Teisserenc de Bort
 17 May 1877 – 23 November 1877 : Marie Camille Alfred, vicomte de Meaux
 23 November 1877 – 13 December 1877 : Jules Ozenne
 13 December 1877 – 4 February 1879 : Pierre Teisserenc de Bort
 4 February 1879 – 4 March 1879 : Charles Lepère
 5 March 1879 – 10 November 1881 : Pierre Tirard – Agriculture and Commerce.

Minister of Commerce and Colonies

 14 November 1881 – 30 January 1882 : Maurice Rouvier – Commerce and Colonies

Ministers of Commerce
 30 January 1882 – 7 August 1882 : Pierre Tirard – Commerce
 7 August 1882 – 21 February 1883 : Pierre Legrand – Commerce
 21 February 1883 – 14 October 1884 : Anne Charles Hérisson – Commerce
 14 October 1884 – 6 April 1885 : Maurice Rouvier – Commerce
 6 April 1885 – 9 November 1885 : Pierre Legrand – Commerce
 9 November 1885 – 7 January 1886 : Lucien Dautresme – Commerce

Ministers of Commerce and Industry
 7 January 1886 – 30 May 1887 : Édouard Lockroy – Commerce and Industry
 30 May 1887 – 3 April 1888 : Lucien Dautresme – Commerce and Industry
 3 April 1888 – 22 February 1889 : Pierre Legrand – Commerce
 22 February 1889 – 17 March 1890 : Pierre Tirard – Commerce and Industry
 17 March 1890 – 6 December 1892 : Jules Roche
 6 December 1892 – 4 April 1893 : Jules Siegfried
 4 April 1893 – 3 December 1893 : Louis Terrier
 3 December 1893 – 30 May 1894 : Jean Marty
 30 May 1894 – 26 January 1895 : Victor Lourties
 26 January 1895 – 1 November 1895 : André Lebon
 1 November 1895 – 29 April 1896 : Gustave Mesureur
 29 April 1896 – 28 June 1898 : Henry Boucher
 28 June 1898 – 1 November 1898 : Émile Maruéjouls
 1 November 1898 – 22 June 1899 : Paul Delombre
 22 June 1899 – 7 June 1902 : Alexandre Millerand
 7 June 1902 – 24 January 1905 : Georges Trouillot
 24 January 1905 – 12 November 1905 : Fernand Dubief
 12 November 1905 – 14 March 1906 : Georges Trouillot
 14 March 1906 – 4 January 1908 : Gaston Doumergue
 4 January 1908 – 24 July 1909 : Jean Cruppi
 24 July 1909 – 2 March 1911 : Jean Dupuy
 2 March 1911 – 27 June 1911 : Alfred Massé
 27 June 1911 – 14 January 1912 : Maurice Couyba
 14 January 1912 – 21 January 1913 : Fernand David
 21 January 1913 – 22 March 1913 : Gabriel Guist'hau

Ministers of Commerce, Industry, Posts, and Telegraphs
 22 March 1913 – 9 December 1913 : Alfred Massé
 9 December 1913 – 17 March 1914 : Louis Malvy
 17 March 1914 – 9 June 1914 : Raoul Péret
 9 June 1914 – 13 June 1914 : Marc Réville
 13 June 1914 – 29 October 1915 : Gaston Thomson
 29 October 1915 – 16 November 1917 : Étienne Clémentel
 16 November 1917 – 5 May 1919 : Étienne Clémentel
 5 May 1919 – 27 November 1919 : Étienne Clémentel
 27 November 1919 – 20 January 1920 : Louis Dubois
 20 January 1920 – 16 January 1921 : Augustuste Isaac
 16 January 1921 – 29 March 1924 : Lucien Dior
 29 March 1924 – 9 June 1924 : Louis Loucheur
 9 June 1924 – 14 June 1924 : Pierre Étienne Flandin
 14 June 1924 – 17 April 1925 : Eugène Raynaldy
 17 April 1925 – 29 October 1925 : Charles Chaumet
 29 October 1925 – 23 June 1926 : Charles Daniel-Vincent
 23 June 1926 – 19 July 1926 : Fernand Chapsal
 19 July 1926 – 23 July 1926 : Louis Loucheur
 23 July 1926 – 2 September 1928 : Maurice Bokanowski
 14 September 1928 – 11 November 1928 : Henry Chéron

Ministers of Commerce and Industry
 11 November 1928 – 3 November 1929 : Georges Bonnefous
 3 November 1929 – 21 February 1930 : Pierre Étienne Flandin
 21 February 1930 – 2 March 1930 : Georges Bonnet
 2 March 1930 – 13 December 1930 : Pierre Étienne Flandin
 13 December 1930 – 27 January 1931 : Louis Loucheur
 27 January 1931 – 20 February 1932 : Louis Rollin
 20 February 1932 – 3 June 1932 : Louis Rollin
 3 June 1932 – 31 January 1933 : Julien Durand (Commerce and Industry)
 31 January 1933 – 26 October 1933 : Louis Serre
 26 October 1933 – 30 January 1934 : Laurent Eynac
 30 January 1934 – 9 February 1934 : Jean Mistler
 9 February 1934 – 8 November 1934 : Lucien Lamoureux
 8 November 1934 – 1 June 1935 : Paul Marchandeau
 1 June 1935 – 7 June 1935 : Laurent Eynac
 7 June 1935 – 4 June 1936 : Georges Bonnet
 4 June 1936 – 22 June 1937 : Paul Bastid
 22 June 1937 – 18 January 1938 : Fernand Chapsal
 18 January 1938 – 10 April 1938 : Pierre Cot (Commerce)
 10 April 1938 – 21 March 1940 : Fernand Gentin
 21 March 1940 – 18 May 1940 : Louis Rollin
 18 May 1940 – 5 June 1940 : Léon Baréty
 5 June 1940 – 16 June 1940 : Albert Chichery
 16 June 1940 – 12 July 1940 : Yves Bouthillier
 7 June 1943 – 9 November 1943 : André Diethelm (Commissaire)
 22 January 1947 – 11 August 1947 : Jean Letourneau
 11 August 1947 – 22 October 1947 : Robert Lacoste
 24 November 1947 – 7 February 1950 : Robert Lacoste
 7 February 1950 – 11 August 1951 : Jean-Marie Louvel
 11 August 1951 – 20 January 1952 : Pierre Pflimlin
 20 January 1952 – 8 March 1952 : Édouard Bonnefous
 8 March 1952 – 8 January 1953 : Jean-Marie Louvel
 8 January 1953 – 11 February 1953 : Paul Ribeyre
 11 February 1953 – 28 June 1953 : Guy Petit
 28 June 1953 – 19 June 1954 : Jean-Marie Louvel
 19 June 1954 – 3 September 1954 : Maurice Bourgès-Maunoury
 3 September 1954 – 23 February 1955 : Henri Ulver
 23 February 1955 – 1 February 1956 : André Morice
 6 November 1957 – 1 June 1958 : Paul Ribeyre
 9 June 1958 – 8 January 1959 : Édouard Ramonet
 8 January 1959 – 14 April 1962 : Jean-Marcel Jeanneney (Industry)
 6 July 1972 – 5 April 1973 : Yvon Bourges
 5 April 1973 – 1 March 1974 : Jean Royer
 1 March 1974 – 28 May 1974 : Yves Guéna (Industry, Commerce and Crafts)
 28 May 1974 – 25 August 1976 : Vincent Ansquer
 25 August 1976 – 30 March 1977 : Pierre Brousse
 30 March 1977 – 5 April 1978 : René Monory
 5 April 1978 – 4 July 1979 : Jacques Barrot
 4 July 1979 – 22 May 1981 : Maurice Charretier
 22 May 1981 – 22 March 1983 : André Delelis
 22 March 1983 – 19 February 1986 : Michel Crépeau
 19 February 1986 – 20 March 1986 : Jean-Marie Bockel
 29 March 1993 – 18 May 1995 : Alain Madelin
 18 May 1995 – 4 June 1997 : Jean-Pierre Raffarin (Small and Medium Enterprises, Commerce and Crafts)
 29 November 2004 – 31 May 2005: Christian Jacob (Small and Medium Enterprises, Commerce, Crafts, Liberal Professions and Consumer Affairs)
 2 June 2005 – 15 May 2007: Christine Lagarde

Secretary of State for Foreign Trade
 19 July 2007 – 18 March 2008 - Hervé Novelli

References

Commerce